Tragovi (trans. Traces) is the eighth studio album by the Serbian and former Yugoslav rock band YU Grupa.

The album marked the return of drummer Ratislav Đelmaš into the band. It is the first album he recorded with the band since YU Grupa in 1975.

Track listing
The music was written by Žika and Dragi Jelić and lyrics by Nikola Čuturilo.
"Kome se raduješ" – 3:12
"Samo ponekad" – 2:57
"Posle snegova nema tragova" – 3:20
"Santa leda" – 3:52
"Otkad nemam te" - 3:30
"Sviram" – 4:17
"Tamni kapci" – 4:24
"Grad snova" – 4:14
"Bluz na tri-četiri" – 3:57

Personnel
Dragi Jelić - guitar, vocals
Žika Jelić - bass guitar
Bata Kostić - guitar
Ratislav Đelmaš - drums

Guest musicians
Saša Lokner - keyboards
Nikola Čuturilo - backing vocals
Pera Joe - harmonica

References 

 EX YU ROCK enciklopedija 1960-2006,  Janjatović Petar;  

YU Grupa albums
1990 albums
PGP-RTB albums